Poggio Rusco is a small town and comune in the Province of Mantua, whose inhabitants number 6,474 as of August 31, 2020.

The town lies in the southeast of the Oltrepò Mantovano area,  from the Po River and just  from Province of Modena, equidistant to principal cities of the Po Valley such as Mantua, Verona, Ferrara, Bologna and Modena.

Origin of the name 
A popular story about the origin of the name said that this place was used by bolognese people as dump; dump in bolognese language was "rusco", and because of it this town now is called Poggio Rusco.

Transportation 
State Road 12, called Abetone-Brennero, which links Po Valley with Germany, intersects the Provincial Road 496, which connects Mantua with Ferrara.

Poggio Rusco railway station is located at the junction between the Verona–Bologna railway and the Suzzara–Ferrara railway.

Twin cities 
  Condé-sur-Noireau, France, since 1999

References

External links 

 PoggioRusco.net - Poggio Rusco internet community
 PoggioRusco.net Images Gallery
 Poggio Rusco on Flickr

Cities and towns in Lombardy